The Schynberg Rundfahrt was a one-day road cycling race held annually in Switzerland between 1982 and 2003. Until 1990, it was a junior race, before switching to amateur, and in 1997 was opened to professionals. It served as the Swiss junior road race championship in 1990, the amateur championship in 1993, and the elite championship in 1997 and 1998.

Winners

References

Cycle races in Switzerland
Recurring sporting events established in 1982
Recurring sporting events disestablished in 2003
1982 establishments in Switzerland
2003 disestablishments in Switzerland
Defunct cycling races in Switzerland